The 1892 Wyoming Seminary vs. Mansfield State Normal football game, played September 28, 1892, was the first-ever American football game played at night.  The game was played between Wyoming Seminary (a private college preparatory school located in the Wyoming Valley of Northeastern Pennsylvania) and Mansfield State Normal School in Mansfield, Pennsylvania.  During the time period, it was common for a college and high school to play each other in football—a practice that has long since been discontinued.

Game summary
The lighting system brought in turned out to be inadequate for gameplay.  The game itself lasted only 20 minutes and there were only 10 plays. Both sides agreed to end at halftime with a 0–0 tie after several players had an unfortunate run-in with a light pole.

References in modern culture

Annual reenactment
This historic game is celebrated by a yearly reenactment of the original game played between Wyoming Seminary and Mansfield State Normal School during an autumn festival known as the "Fabulous 1890s Weekend."  The re-enactment of the game is a play-by-play version of the actual game as recorded.  Fans who watch the game are sometimes known to correct players when they deviate from the original recorded plays.

100th anniversary
The 100th anniversary of the game happened to occur on Monday, September 28, 1992. Monday Night Football celebrated "100 years of night football" with a game between the Los Angeles Raiders and the Kansas City Chiefs at Arrowhead Stadium.  The Chiefs won 27–7 in front of 77,486 fans.

See also
1879 VFA season, for a description of the first night game in Australian rules football
1892 college football season
1905 Cooper vs. Fairmount football game
 List of historically significant college football games
 Kanaweola Athletic Club, hosts of the first professional football night game

References

External links
 Mansfield University of Pennsylvania official website
 Wyoming Seminary
 1890s Weekend Official Site 
 Play-By-Play at a fan site

1892 college football season
vs. Wyoming Seminary 1892
1892 in sports in Pennsylvania
September 1892 sports events